The National Railway Company of Belgium (or NMBS; , or SNCB) is the national railway company of Belgium. The company formally styles itself using the Dutch and French abbreviations NMBS/SNCB. The corporate logo designed in 1936 by Henry van de Velde consists of the linguistically neutral letter B in a horizontal oval.

History
NMBS/SNCB is an autonomous government company, formed in 1926 as successor to the Belgian State Railways. In 2005, the company was split up into three parts: Infrabel, which manages the railway infrastructure, network operations and network access, the public railway operator NMBS/SNCB itself to manage the freight (B-Cargo) and passenger services, and NMBS/SNCB-Holding, which owns both public companies and supervises the collaboration between them. Essentially, this was a move to facilitate future liberalisation of railway freight and passenger services in agreement with European regulations. Several freight operators have since received access permissions for the Belgian network. In February 2011, NMBS/SNCB Logistics began operating as a separate business.

Faced with rising losses, in June 2012, the Belgian transport minister announced further reform: NMBS/SNCB Holding would be split up, so NMBS/SNCB (the train operator) would be separate from Infrabel (the infrastructure owner). Unions oppose the reform.

NMBS/SNCB-Holding was merged into SNCB in 2014 in order to simplify the structure of the Belgian railways.

NMBS/SNCB holds a Royal Warrant from the Court of Belgium.

Operations

In 2008 NMBS/SNCB carried 207 million passengers a total of 8,676 million passenger-kilometres over a network of 3,536 kilometres (of which 2,950 km are electrified, mainly at 3000 V DC and 351 km at 25 kV 50 Hz AC).
In 2017, that number rose to 230 million passengers carried, and Belgium has a rail network of 3,602 km of main railway lines (or 6,399 km of mainline tracks).

National enforcement body 

Sometimes passengers are not satisfied with the answer of railway companies or passengers do not receive any answer in one month, in which case they can seek the assistance of the Federal Public Service Mobility and Transport.

Gallery

See also 

 Eurostar - NMBS/SNCB holds a 5% stake
 History of rail transport in Belgium
 List of railway lines in Belgium
 List of SNCB/NMBS classes
 Rail transport in Belgium
 Thalys
 Transportation in Belgium

Notes

References

External links 

Bueker.net – Map of the Belgian, Dutch and Luxembourg rail networks
SNCB website
List of stations: Liste des gares SNCB  - Lijst van NMBS-stations 
Collection of Google Earth locations of SNCB stations (requires Google Earth software) from the Google Earth Community forum.
 

Railway companies of Belgium
Eurostar
Railteam
Belgian companies established in 1926
Railway companies established in 1926
Belgian brands
Government-owned companies of Belgium
Government agencies established in 1926
Government-owned railway companies